Orphans of the Street is a 1938 American drama film directed by John H. Auer and written by Eric Taylor, Jack Townley and Olive Cooper. The film stars Tommy Ryan, Robert Livingston, June Storey, Ralph Morgan, Harry Davenport and James Burke. The film was released on December 5, 1938, by Republic Pictures.

Plot

Cast
Tommy Ryan as Tommy Ryan
Robert Livingston as Bob Clayton
June Storey as Lorna Ramsey
Ralph Morgan as Martin Sands
Harry Davenport as Doc Will Ramsey
James Burke as Police Officer Lou Manning
Sidney Blackmer as Parker
Victor Kilian as Dave Farmer
Hobart Cavanaugh as William Grant
Herbert Rawlinson as Adams
Robert Gleckler as Hughes
Ian Wolfe as Eli Thadius Bunting
Reed Hadley as Miller
Don Douglas as Colonel Daniels 
Paul Everton as Judge
Ace the Wonder Dog as Skippy

References

External links
 

1938 films
1930s English-language films
American drama films
1938 drama films
Republic Pictures films
Films directed by John H. Auer
American black-and-white films
1930s American films